The Vance-Pontotoc Historic District, in Memphis, Tennessee, was a historic district which was listed on the National Register of Historic Places. It was listed in 1980 for its architectural significance. It included a number of early shotgun houses, which the Tennessee Encyclopedia has noted were endangered and "disappearing rapidly". The shotgun houses and/or other residences included Late Victorian, Queen Anne, and Italianate styling.

The district borders made an irregular pattern along Vance and Pontotoc Avenues in Memphis. Twelve of the buildings were destroyed by fire between 1979 and 1982. Only 12 of the 65 listed buildings remain. The district was delisted from the National Register on March 18, 1987.

References

Shotgun architecture in Tennessee
National Register of Historic Places in Shelby County, Tennessee
Historic districts on the National Register of Historic Places in Tennessee
Victorian architecture in Tennessee
Italianate architecture in Tennessee
Queen Anne architecture in Tennessee
Former National Register of Historic Places in Tennessee